Dongwon Institute of Science and Technology is a private college located in Yangsan City, South Gyeongsang province, South Korea. It was called Yangsan College until August 2013.

See also
List of colleges and universities in South Korea

External links 
Dongwon Institute of Science and Technology website

Universities and colleges in South Gyeongsang Province